The Red Tent is a historical novel by Anita Diamant, published in 1997 by Wyatt Books for St. Martin's Press. It is a first-person narrative that tells the story of Dinah, daughter of Jacob and Leah, sister of Joseph. She is a minor character in the Bible, but the author has broadened her story. The book's title refers to the tent in which women of Jacob's tribe must, according to the ancient law, take refuge while menstruating or giving birth, and in which they find mutual support and encouragement from their mothers, sisters and aunts.

Plot summary
Dinah opens the story by recounting for readers the union of her mother Leah and father Jacob, as well as the expansion of the family to include Leah's sister Rachel, and the handmaids Zilpah and Bilhah. Leah is depicted as capable but testy, Rachel as something of a belle, but kind and creative, Zilpah as eccentric and spiritual, and Bilhah as the gentle and quiet one of the quartet.

Dinah remembers sitting in the red tent with her mother and aunts, gossiping about local events and taking care of domestic duties between visits to Jacob, the family's patriarch. A number of other characters not seen in the biblical account appear here, including Laban's second wife Ruti and her feckless sons.

According to the Bible's account in Genesis 34, Dinah was "defiled" by a prince of Shechem, although he is described as being genuinely in love with Dinah. He also offers a bride price fit for royalty. Displeased at how the prince treated their sister, her brothers Simeon (spelled "Simon" in the book) and Levi treacherously tell the Shechemites that all will be forgiven if the prince and his men undergo the Jewish rite of circumcision (brit milah) so as to unite the people of Hamor, king of Shechem, with the tribe of Jacob. The Shechemites agree, and shortly after they go under the knife, while incapacitated by pain, they are murdered by Dinah's brothers and their male servants, who then return with Dinah.

In The Red Tent, Dinah genuinely loves the prince and willingly becomes his bride. She is horrified and grief-stricken by her brothers' murderous rampage. After cursing her brothers and father she escapes to Egypt, where she gives birth to a son. In time she finds another love and reconciles with her brother Joseph, who is now vizier of Egypt.  At the death of Jacob, she visits her estranged family.  She learns she has been all but forgotten by her other living brothers and father but that her story lives on with the women of Jacob's tribe.

Reception
The book was a New York Times bestseller  and book club discussion guides for it have been published. According to the Los Angeles Times review, "By giving a voice to Dinah, one of the silent female characters in Genesis, the novel has struck a chord with women who may have felt left out of biblical history.  It celebrates mothers and daughters and the mysteries of the life cycle."  The Christian Science Monitor wrote that the novel "vividly conjures up the ancient world of caravans, shepherds, farmers, midwives, slaves, and artisans...Diamant is a compelling narrator of a tale that has timeless resonance."

Historical accuracy and context
The work promotes the biblical story. However, it is neither biblically nor historically correct. 

Diamant acknowledges that there is no evidence that ancient Hebrews used a menstrual tent for retreat, although she describes it as a common feature in other pre-modern cultures, as well as some modern cultures.

Cultural attitudes towards menstruation, including taboos, are widespread throughout history and around the world. These may include the seclusion of girls at puberty and of women after childbirth. Impurity after childbirth was a widespread belief, allied with the need for ritual purification.

Adaptations
Lifetime adapted the novel into a two-part miniseries, which premiered December 7 and 8, 2014. Dinah is portrayed by Rebecca Ferguson. Leah is portrayed by Minnie Driver, and Rachel by Morena Baccarin.

See also
 Culture and menstruation
 Mikvah, a bath of ritual purification 
 Niddah

General references 
 
 Rabbi J. Avram Rothman, ''The Red Tent - if you knew Dina like I know Dina. Aish.com, June 2001. 
 Photos of the first edition of The Red Tent

Citations 

1997 American novels
American historical novels
American novels adapted into television shows
Feminist novels
Jewish American novels
Novels based on the Bible